István Szentgyörgyi  (1881, Bégaszentgyörgy - 1938, Budapest) was a Hungarian sculptor. His work exemplified neo-classicism. Fourteen of his statues are in the possession of the Hungarian National Gallery and a copy of "Tip Catting" can be found in the Museum of Modern Art in Rome.

Biography

His works include "Tip Catting" 1920, "Portrait of Ferenc Herczeg" (undated), "Lamp (sculpture)" 1923, "Áron Szilády" in Kiskunhalas 1927, "My Son with a Dog" 1927, "Memorial of the 32nd Regiment" 1933, and "Portrait of István Réti".

References

External links
Fine Arts in Hungary

Hungarian sculptors
1881 births
1938 deaths
20th-century sculptors